Borhan Uddin is a Bangladesh Nationalist Party politician and the former Member of Parliament of Noakhali-6.

Career
Borhan Uddin was elected to parliament from Noakhali-6 as a Bangladesh Nationalist Party candidate in 1979.

References

Bangladesh Nationalist Party politicians
Living people
2nd Jatiya Sangsad members
Year of birth missing (living people)